John Coffin Jones Sr. (1749 – October 25, 1829) was a businessman who served as the Speaker of the Massachusetts House of Representatives from 1802 to 1803.

Early life
Jones was born in 1749. He was the son of Ichabod Jones (d. 1790).  John attended and graduated from Harvard College.

Career
In 1790, Jones wrote to Thomas Jefferson upon his return from France as the U.S. Minister regarding "whalefishery," which Jones considered it to "ever been the most important branch of business to this State, by furnishing its most valuable Staple export, creating a great consumption of the Produce of the Country; and thereby giving employment to a vast number of husbandmen and mechanics, whilst it proved a most extensive nursery of expert and hardy seamen." Jones was a businessman who became a member of the Massachusetts House of Representatives.  From 1802 to 1803, he served as the Speaker of the House succeeding Edward Robbins.  Jones was succeeded by Harrison Gray Otis, who later served as the Mayor of Boston and a U.S. Senator from Massachusetts.

In 1814, Jones was elected a member of the American Antiquarian Society.

Personal life
Jones was married three times. 	Among his wives were Mary Lee. Together, they were the parents of:

 Thomas Jones.

His second wife was Abigail C. Jones, and Jones' third wife was Elizabeth (née Champlin) (1770–1837) the sister of U.S. Senator from Rhode Island Christopher G. Champlin and grandson of Christopher Champlin, a merchant, ship owner and financier of Newport, Rhode Island. Together, they were the parents of:

 Margaret Champlin Jones (1792–1848), who married Benjamin Underhill Coles in 1817. After his death, she married Hon. Benjamin Gorham in 1829.
 Martha Ellery Jones (b. 1794), who married Isaac Underill Coles, the brother of her elder sister's first husband, Benjamin Underhill Coles, in 1823.
 Mary Jones (1795–1837), who died unmarried.
 John Coffin Jones Jr. (1796–1861), who was the first United States Consular Agent to the Kingdom of Hawaii.
 Christopher Champlin Jones (b. 1798)
 Anna Powel Jones (b. 1803)

Jones died on October 25, 1829, in Boston, Massachusetts and was buried at King's Chapel Burying Ground in Boston.

Descendants
Through his daughter Martha, he was the grandfather of Mary Lee Coles (–1922), who married Harry Coster, who were both prominent in New York society during the Gilded Age.

References

External links

 John Coffin Jones papers at Baker Library Special Collections, Harvard Business School.
 

1749 births
1829 deaths
Harvard College alumni
Speakers of the Massachusetts House of Representatives
Members of the Massachusetts House of Representatives
Massachusetts Federalists
Members of the American Antiquarian Society
Burials in Boston